Pēteris Berģis (March 18, 1882 – January 21, 1942) was a Latvian lawyer and politician.

Biography 
Berģis graduated from the St. Petersburg Polytechnic Institute and from the University of Kazan in 1916.

During the Latvian freedom revolution in November 1919, he returned to Latvia. In 1920, he was one of the members of the Latvian delegation in peace talks with Soviet Russia. He later acted as a member of the Latvian-Lithuanian border arbitration tribunal.

He was democratic member of the center, but later joined the Radical Democratic Party. In 1922, he was elected to the 1st Saeima.

On June 14, 1941, Berģis was arrested and deported to the USSR, where he died in 1942 in the camp in Solikamsk.

References 

1882 births
1942 deaths
People from Madona Municipality
People from Kreis Wenden
Democratic Centre (Latvia) politicians
Ministers of the Interior of Latvia
Deputies of the 1st Saeima
20th-century Latvian lawyers
Kazan Federal University alumni
Latvian people who died in Soviet detention
People who died in the Gulag

External links 

 Latvijas Republikas valdības